MAGFest (Music and Gaming Festival, originally the Mid-Atlantic Gaming Festival) is an annual festival held in the Washington metropolitan area that celebrates video games and video game music, as well as their surrounding culture. MAGFest's primary features are a large open video gaming room, a hall of arcade cabinets, concerts by chiptune artists and video game cover bands, and a bring your own computer (BYOC) LAN party.

Attractions 

MAGFest's arcade hall is open 24 hours a day. The exhibition hall contains hundreds of full-size arcade cabinets, and even pinball machines that are donated for the event from local collectors and vending companies. All arcades are set to play for free on admission price, and are monitored 24 hours a day by maintenance and technical staff.  The arcade hall includes specialty lighting, laser lighting, and music to invoke the feeling of a traditional arcade. The game selection ranges from 1970's vintage black and white games, vector monitors games, Cathode Ray Tube games, modern/Indie arcades; as well as contemporary Japanese candy cabinets and Japanese dance/music games like Dance Dance Revolution and Taiko No Tatsujin.  Arcades range from various manufacturers like Atari, Nintendo, Taito, Midway, Williams, Capcom, Sega, ICE, Rock Ola, and Exidy.  Games that challenge various abilities include driving simulators, shooting simulators, labyrinth games, and others.  There are multiple events and tournaments that occur during the event that allow you to challenge dozens of others for prizes.  They also host a ten-game tournament that spans the entire event which allows players to openly compete on 10 classic arcade games to work on getting the highest scores possible with the ultimate prize being given to the player who scores the most points total on all games.

There a console hall open 24 hours a day that houses over a hundred televisions and attached game consoles, where guests are invited to play at will and each station's game is periodically swapped with a different one from a game library.  Attendees are encouraged to bring their own controllers or fighting game pads to compete with.  Consoles range from vintage Atari 2600, Intellivision style games all the way through the years to the most current and up to date Xbox/PS/Nintendo systems and games.  Even steam titles are playable and indie game developers have been known to introduce or beta test new games at the events.  Tournaments are performed frequently throughout the event on several platforms and game types for prizes.

In 2013 the MAGFest Indie Videogame Showcase, "MIVS" was started.  It features between 40 and 60 booths of indie game developers each year.  Since 2016 there has been an "Indie Arcade" section, housing new arcade games created by indie developers and artists from around the world.  The bulk of these cabinets are curated through Death By Audio Arcade in NY.  In 2017 the "Indie Homebrew" sub-section was started, which has featured new indie games that can be played on classic consoles from the 1980s and 1990s such as the Atari 2600, NES, etc...

The concert areas host nightly performances in multiple rooms simultaneously of famous and up and coming bands.  Music is themed, but not limited to; Chip Tunes, video game music, and related works. Many luminaries of video game music fan culture have performed at MAGFest. Previous bands include Machinae Supremacy, Earthbound Papas, Minibosses, Powerglove, the NESkimos, the Advantage and Chromelodeon.

Other major attractions include guest panels from the video game industry such as Sid Meier, Jon St. John and Nobuo Uematsu. In addition, the fan remixing community is well represented with sites such as OverClocked ReMix. Filmmakers such as X-Strike Studios, Main Moon Productions, PBC Productions, and There Will Be Brawl have also appeared at the event. MAGFest has also included academic panels such as "Game Studies 101" where attendees were given a basic introduction to the manner in which scholars study video games.

Additionally, MAGFest features DJ battles, a jam space, an open mic stage, a large LAN party environment, a film screening room, a tabletop gaming room, vendors, contests like "name-that-tune," and a video game "challenge booth" where players can "try to tackle insanely difficult gaming feats for prizes of all sorts."

History 

MAGFest was created by Joseph "Joe" Yamine and Sean Rider in 2002, as a small event in Roanoke, Virginia. Marinelli, director of press and public relations, stated in interview that Yamine "wanted people to just come together, play games, and rock out to some great video game cover bands". The original event featured three bands, an arcade room, a dealers room, a video room devoted to anime, a dance party area, and auctions of rare video games and art.

Brendan Becker took over from Yamine at the following event, and the number of attendees grew from 250 to 3,000 over the course of eight years. Marinelli credited word of mouth for the slow but continued growth of the event, adding "It’s not about seeing something no one’s ever seen more; it’s about getting together and celebrating what you love". The event was extended in length from MAGFest 8 in 2010, going from a three-day to a four-day schedule.

The event went through multiple changes in 2012. MAGFest Inc was formally incorporated as a nonprofit organisation to manage the event, and MAGFest moved to the Gaylord National Harbour Convention Centre for MAGFest X, a far larger venue than the previous. This then became the primary venue for the event. Beginning in 2014, some additional annual conventions began to be held. This started with MAGLabs at the former venue in Virginia, and MAGWest held in California each year. Attendance at the main event had reached 20,000 by 2016, and peaked at 24,000 at Super MAGFest 2020, held that January.

In November 2020, an organisation named "friends of MAGFest" expressed concern about the MAGFest board of directors, alleging financial neglect, mismanagement and abuse by the Executive Director, Paul Birtel. After negotiations with Friends of MAGFest, Birtel fired three board members associated with the group as well as the events director, which in effect cancelled the planned Pandemic-era virtual event. Further board resignations occurred in January 2021, followed by Birtel himself later that month.

Event history

Main events

MAGLabs
In the wake of MAGFest's move from Virginia to Maryland in 2012, a secondary circuit of smaller events were held at the former primary venue in Alexandria. MAGLabs has not been held since 2018, but the organisers have indicated that future events may be held.

MAGWest
A west coast MAGFest circuit launched in 2017. The event was conducted online in 2020 and 2021 due to the COVID-19 pandemic. These events were uploaded to the official YouTube channel after they concluded.

References

External links 

 
 MAGFest 7 pictures
 MAGFest 5 pictures
 MAGFest 1 pictures

Press 
 Destructoid review of MAGFest 6
 PBC Productions' MAGFest 6 Montage
 D.C. Music Download Review

2002 establishments in Maryland
Music festivals in Washington, D.C.
Music festivals established in 2002
Video game concert tours
Video game conventions